An animation director is either the director in charge of all aspects of the animation process during the production of an animated film or television, and animated segment for a live action film or television show, or the animator in charge of correcting layouts and drawings. The difference between the two is largely the difference between the western and eastern animation industries.

Responsibilities

Western production pipeline
In western animation, such as Disney, the responsibilities of an animation director include directing the storyboards, character designs, background animation, and other technical aspects of a project's animation. Some animated film productions may split the duties between an animation director, who focuses on the creation of the animation, and a director who oversees all other aspects of the film. A supervising animator is commonly in charge of all aspects of the design and artwork for a single major character. The supervising animator oversees a group of animators who complete the entire scenes in which a particular character appears.  The day-to-day responsibilities of an animation director may include checking and updating lists for each scene.

Eastern production pipeline
In the eastern production pipeline, most notably in the anime industry, the role of an "animation director" is significantly different from its western counterpart in the animation production pipeline. These corrections can range from the sakkan literally correcting parts of the animation that are off-model or not up-to-par, to changing some of the drawings into their style, or simply maintaining a level of quality while allowing for free expression from the key animators. Although these roles are meant to be encompassed by a small number of animators maintaining high-quality work, the state of the Japanese animation industry has shifted the roles, with sou sakkans appearing in multiples across singular episodes at times, which is largely due to the lack of animators and lack of time or bad scheduling which vastly limit the possibility of only a few sou sakkans appearing across an entire work. These terms and pipeline system originated in Japan, but the Chinese animation industry has a similar production system with more-or-less the same roles, such as the chief animation director (总作画监督) and animation director (作画监督).

Besides the sakkan credit, there is also the  credit, although there are several nuances of the role. In some instances, such as Yoshikazu Yasuhiko's role on Mobile Suit Gundam, the role refers to Yasuhiko performing what is basically a sou sakkan role with a few added responsibilities like drawing layouts himself (rather than correcting them). Early works by studio Bones utilized the "animation director" role to a similar capacity according to director Hiroyuki Kitakubo. Another way the credit is used is as a sort of pseudo-director, such as Keizou Shimizu's role on Legend of the Galactic Heroes seasons 3 and 4, in which he described his role on the series as him acting as both a drawing director who supervised layouts and animation, as well as performing traditional directing duties such as checking storyboards and correcting them. One other way the credit is used is much closer to the western production pipeline's understanding of the role, in which the animation director acts more like a technical director; for example, Reiji Nagazono has been credited as such on several of the works by Polygon Pictures, in which studio representative director Shuuzou John Shiota described as being the person who helps to define and supervise the entirety of the animation process in a project.

References

 
 
Arts occupations
Design occupations
Directors